The Barony of Burren is a geographical division of County Clare, Ireland, that in turn is divided into civil parishes. It covers a large part of the Burren.

Legal context
Baronies were created after the Norman invasion of Ireland as divisions of counties and were used the administration of justice and the raising of revenue. While baronies continue to be officially defined units, they have been administratively obsolete since 1898. However, they continue to be used in land registration and in specification, such as in planning permissions. In many cases, a barony corresponds to an earlier Gaelic túath which had submitted to the Crown.

Landscape
The Parliamentary Gazetteer of Ireland 1845 describes the barony as follows:

History

The district was once called Cean-gan, which means "the external promontory".
Ptolemy wrote this name as Gan-ganii.
Later it was called Hy-Loch-Lean, which means "the district on the waters of the sea".
The present name of Burren means a distant part of a country.
In 1841 the population of the barony was 12,786 in 2,056 houses, mostly engaged in agriculture.

Parishes and settlements

The barony contains the civil parishes of Abbey, Carran, Drumcreehy, Glaninagh, Kilcorney, Kilonahan, Kilheny, Kilmoon, Noughoval, Oughtmama, and Rathborney. It contains the villages of Abbey, Burren, Behagh, Bealaclugga, Currenroe, Ballyvaughan, Ballyconree, Ballinacraggy, Loughrusk, Gleninagh, Murroghkelly, Murroghtwohy, Fermoyle, Noughaval, Aughnish and Finavara.

References
Citations

Sources

Baronies of County Clare